Doug or Douglas Green may refer to:

Doug Green (footballer) (born 1951), former Australian rules footballer
Doug Green (Louisiana politician) (born 1950), former Louisiana insurance commissioner
Doug Green (Ohio politician) (1955–2021), Republican member of the Ohio House of Representatives
Douglas Green (cricketer) (1902–1990), Australian cricketer
Douglas B. Green (born 1946), American musician, arranger and Western music songwriter
Douglas R. Green (born 1955), American scientist

See also
Doug Greenall (1927–2007), English rugby league footballer